Zerelda Elizabeth Cole James Simms Samuel (January 29, 1825 – February 10, 1911) was the mother of outlaws Frank James and Jesse James.

Biography

Cole was born to James and Sarah Lindsay Cole on January 29, 1825, in Woodford County, Kentucky. She had one brother, younger than her by one year, named Jesse Richard Cole. Her brother committed suicide in 1895 for unknown reasons. 

She was of English and Scottish descent. When Zerelda was a child, her father broke his neck in a riding accident, leaving her mother with two young children. They were taken in by her paternal grandfather, who owned a saloon. Later, her mother remarried Robert Thomason, a farmer. Zerelda did not get along with her new stepfather, Robert, so she went to live with some of her mother's relatives in Kentucky, where she attended a Catholic girls' school.

First marriage
Zerelda Cole got married to Robert Sallee James on December 28, 1841, at the residence of her uncle, James Madison Lindsay, in Stamping Ground, Kentucky, when she was 16 years old. A college friend of Robert's officiated as the best man, and tobacco was given in bond. The two moved to the vicinity of Centerville (later Kearney, Missouri).

Robert James was a commercial hemp farmer, a slave owner, and a popular evangelical minister in the Baptist Church. Zerelda bore him four children.
Alexander Franklin James (b. January 10, 1843 – d. February 18, 1915)
Robert R. James (b. July 19, 1845 – d. August 21, 1845)
Jesse Woodson James (b. September 5, 1847 – d. April 3, 1882)
Susan Lavenia James (b. November 25, 1849 – d. March 3, 1889)

Shortly after the birth of his daughter, Susan, Robert James moved to California to preach to the gold miners, where he contracted either pneumonia, cholera or typhoid and died on (according to tradition) August 18, 1850. His grave has never been officially identified, and no marker exists for him today. There is a much-disputed story that in later years, Jesse went looking for his father's grave.

Second marriage
Benjamin Simms (born circa 1830 – d. January 2, 1854) was a wealthy farmer who married the widowed Zerelda James on September 30, 1852. The marriage proved unhappy, primarily because Simms disliked Frank James and Jesse James, to whom he was reportedly cruel. Zerelda left Simms, who died on January 2, 1854, when his horse threw him.

Third marriage
Zerelda got married a third time to Dr. Reuben Samuel (b. January 1829 – d. March 1, 1908), on September 25, 1855. Samuel has been described as "a quiet, passive man...standing in the shadow of his outspoken, forceful wife". Dr. Reuben Samuel and Zerelda Samuel had four children:

 Sarah Louisa Samuel (b. April 7, 1858 – d. July 14, 1921)
 John Thomas Samuel (b. December 25, 1861 – d. March 15, 1934)
 Fanny Quantrill Samuel (b. October 18, 1863 – d. May 3, 1922)
 Archie Peyton Samuel (b. July 26, 1866 – d. January 26, 1875)

There has been some dispute as to the spelling of the surname "Samuel". Sometimes it is spelled "Samuels". However, the spelling "Samuel" is attested by birth records, family gravestones, and neighbor Homer Croy.

Pinkerton Raid
The Pinkerton Agency's founder and leader, Allan Pinkerton, attempted to capture the James brothers. On the night of January 25, 1875, he staged a raid on the homestead. Detectives threw an incendiary device into the house; it exploded, killing James's young half-brother Archie (named for Archie Clement) and blowing off the right arm of Zerelda Samuel. Afterwards, Pinkerton denied that the raid's intent was arson, but biographer Ted Yeatman located a letter by Pinkerton in the Library of Congress in which Pinkerton declared his intention to "burn the house down."

Post Jesse: The James Farm Tour

With all the press of the famous James brothers of Missouri, the hysteria of the Frank James trial, and all the dime novels of which the family did not approve, it was inevitable that people would turn up at the farm wanting to see the place where the infamous Jesse James had grown up.

Zerelda charged for the tour, and the visitors were taken on a tour of the farmhouse including a vivid account of the Pinkerton Raid in January. The fireplace does not bear burn marks but there is evidence of which floor boards were salvaged and which were replaced when the repairs were made as compensation by Pinkerton to Mrs. James for the death of her son and injury to herself.

The tour culminated at the grave of Jesse, who was originally buried in the front yard outside Zerelda's bedroom window so when she slept at night, she had a clear, unobstructed view of his grave. Zerelda was worried that someone would come and take him so she had him buried an extra few feet down than the standard six. For an extra few coins visitors were allowed to scoop up the "authentic" pebbles from the grave. Zerelda replenished them from the stream where the boys used to play. Years later when Jesse's wife, also named Zerelda, died, his mother had Jesse reburied alongside his wife at Mount Olivet in Kearney, MO. She further would play on the sympathies of her visitors by offering to sell old, rusted, often inoperable guns that she said belonged to Jesse before he died, which in reality she had bought second-hand, leading to a proliferation of people claiming to and sincerely believing that they owned a gun that had once belonged to Jesse James.

Death

Zerelda died in 1911 in the Burlington carriage on a train traveling to San Francisco, California of a heart ailment (some 20 miles outside of Oklahoma City). She was 86 years old and was buried next to Reuben Samuel, her third husband, and sons Jesse and Archie at Mount Olivet Cemetery, Clay County, Missouri.

Popular culture

 Mamaw by Susan M. Dodd, a fictional book about Zerelda.
 Fran Ryan played Zerelda in the 1980 film The Long Riders, which was a more or less accurate film about the last years of the James-Younger gang after the Civil War
 Jane Darwell played Zerelda in the 1939 movie starring Tyrone Power, which has her character dying at the film's beginning, while in reality she outlived her son by nearly 30 years.
 Mentioned in the Tom Waits song "Diamond in Your Mind"
 The actress Ann Doran portrayed Zerelda in the ABC television series The Legend of Jesse James (1965–1966). Christopher Jones and Allen Case played Jesse and Frank James, respectively.

Timeline

 1825 Birth on January 29
 1850 Death of Robert Sallee James, her first husband
 1854 Death of Benjamin Simms, her second husband
 1875 Death of son Archie Samuel
 1882 Death of son Jesse James
 1900 US Census in Clay County, Missouri
 1908 Death of Reuben Samuel, her third husband
 1911 Death in Oklahoma City, Oklahoma on February 10
 1915 Death of son Frank James

References

Bibliography 
 Settle, William A. Jr.: Jesse James Was His Name, or, Fact and Fiction Concerning the Careers of the Notorious James Brothers of Missouri, University of Nebraska Press, 1977
 Yeatman, Ted P.: Frank and Jesse James: The Story Behind the Legend, Cumberland House, 2001
 Stiles, T.J.: Jesse James: Last Rebel of the Civil War, Alfred A. Knopf, 2002
 Jesse and Frank James: The Family History by Phillip Steele

External links

 Official website for the Family of Jesse James: Stray Leaves, A James Family in America Since 1650
 The James Farm

1825 births
1911 deaths
People from Woodford County, Kentucky
People from Kearney, Missouri
American amputees
James–Younger Gang